Vittoria "Vicky" Piria (born 11 November 1993 in Milan) is an Italian-British racing driver who currently races in Formula Renault Eurocup and W Series.

Career

Karting
Piria grew up in Perugia in Umbria, she began karting in 2003 and raced primarily in her native Italy for the majority of this part of her career, working her way up from the junior ranks to progress through to the KF3 category by 2008.

Formula Renault and Formula Lista Junior
In 2009, Piria graduated to single-seaters, but had only part-time entries. She contested in Italian Formula 2000 Light and Formula Renault 2.0 championships for Tomcat Racing, having participate just six and two races respectively. Also she competed in Formula Lista Junior opening round at Dijon.

Formula Abarth
In 2010, Piria switched to the newly launched Formula Abarth series in Italy, stating with Tomcat Racing. Her best result was a finish in fourteenth place at Magione that brought her 34th place in the series standings. Piria remained in Formula Abarth for a second season in 2011 but switched to Prema Powerteam, when the series split in European and Italian series. She had five-pointscoring finishes in Italian and three European Series and finally finished fifteenth and eighteenth respectively.

GP3 Series
Piria made her debut in the GP3 Series in 2012 with Trident Racing, who took over Addax Team's entry. Piria finished the season without scoring championship points and a best finish of 12th.

European F3 Open
In 2013 Piria raced in European F3 Open with BVM Racing. She finished tenth in points.

Pro Mazda
In 2014 she raced for JDC MotorSports in the Pro Mazda Championship, part of the Mazda Road to Indy. She was one of three female drivers contesting the 2014 championship.

W Series 
In 2019, Piria participated to the selections for the newly created W Series. She passed the first phase and the final selection, becoming one of the 18 drivers to compete in the 6-event series, the only Italian in it.

Racing record

Career summary

* Season still in progress.

Complete GP3 Series results
(key) (Races in bold indicate pole position) (Races in italics indicate fastest lap)

Complete Pro Mazda Championship results

Complete W Series results
(key) (Races in bold indicate pole position) (Races in italics indicate fastest lap)

† Driver did not finish the race, but was classified as they completed more than 90% of the race distance.
* Season still in progress.

References

External links

 
 

1993 births
Living people
Italian people of British descent
Racing drivers from Milan
Italian female racing drivers
Italian Formula Renault 2.0 drivers
Formula Lista Junior drivers
Formula Abarth drivers
Italian GP3 Series drivers
FIA Formula Two Championship drivers
MRF Challenge Formula 2000 Championship drivers
Indy Pro 2000 Championship drivers
W Series drivers
Prema Powerteam drivers
Trident Racing drivers
BVM Racing drivers
JDC Motorsports drivers
Bhaitech drivers